The Block Realty Building is a historic commercial building at 723 West Markham Street in Little Rock, Arkansas.  It is a two-story structure, built out of steel and concrete, with a flat roof.  It is supported by corten steel columns, with its first floor predominantly finished in glass, and the upper level in aggregate concrete tiles.  It was built in 1964 to a design by architect-engineer Eugene Levy, and is a good local example of commercial Mid-Century Modern architecture.

The building was listed on the National Register of Historic Places in 2018.

See also
National Register of Historic Places listings in Little Rock, Arkansas

References

Commercial buildings on the National Register of Historic Places in Arkansas
Buildings and structures completed in 1964
Buildings and structures in Little Rock, Arkansas
National Register of Historic Places in Little Rock, Arkansas